Luther Thomas was an alto saxophonist and multi-instrumentalist from St. Louis.

He is known for his free jazz playing drawing also on funk. He was involved with the Black Artists Group starting in the 1960s, played in the Human Arts Ensemble with Charles Bobo Shaw in the 1970s, and led a group called Dizzazz in the early 1980s. He has also played saxophone for James Chance and the Contortions.   Thomas-led sessions from the early 1970s have been reissued on CD as part of Atavistic Records' Unheard Music Series.  Luther Thomas was born on June 23, 1950, and died on September 8, 2009.

Discography
Luther Thomas Creative Ensemble – Funky Donkey (Circle)
 Human Arts Ensemble: Junk Trap (Black Saint, 1978)
 Human Arts Ensemble: : Live, Vol. 1 (Circle, 1978)
 Saint Louis Creative Ensemble: Live at Moers (Moers Music, 1979)
 Luther Thomas and Dizzaz: Yo' Momma (Moers, 1981)
 Luther Thomas Quintett: Don't Tell! (2007, with Ted Daniel, Charles Eubanks, Wilber Morris, Denis Charles)
 BAGin It (CIMP, 1996) with Ted daniel, Wilber Morris, Dennis Charles
 Luther Thomas and John Lindberg: Spirit of St. Louis (Ayler Records, 2008)
 DizzazzDatonezz Gang$tarJazz with Per Løkkegaard and Miloud Sabri (Helicopter Records, 2010)
 Luther Thomas: In Denmark (ILK Music, 2014)

Gallery

References

1950 births
2009 deaths
Music of St. Louis
American jazz saxophonists
American male saxophonists
CIMP artists
20th-century American saxophonists
20th-century American male musicians
American male jazz musicians
Human Arts Ensemble members
Black Saint/Soul Note artists
Atavistic Records artists